Cesar Benito Fernandez is a composer, orchestrator, conductor and music producer originally from Marbella, Spain. He is best known for composing the music scores of some of Spain's most critically acclaimed and commercially successful TV series in recent years, including La Chica de Ayer (Spanish remake of  BBC's Life on Mars), Los Protegidos and the international hit The Time in Between (El Tiempo Entre Costuras), a period drama that in 2013 broke a twelve years old record with the highest ratings for an opening of a prime time TV series in Spain. That record was broken again in 2015 by the comedy series Allí abajo, also scored by Benito, making the #1 prime time TV series in Spain for three consecutive years and running for a total of five seasons. Other recent works by Benito include the prime time TV shows Benidorm and Desaparecidos (currently on its second season).

El Tiempo Entre Costuras soundtrack album reached #2 on Spain’s iTunes Store Albums, and #1 on the Soundtracks category. It also won numerous awards, including Best Music for Television by the Academy of Sciences and Arts of Television of Spain, and is one of the most played TV soundtracks worldwide on Spotify. Tema de Sira, the first track on the album was the music chosen by Spanish gymnast Carolina Rodríguez to accompany her ribbon routine on competitions around the world, including winning an olympic diploma at the 2016 Summer Olympics.

Benito studied piano, music theory and composition and graduated with honors at the Conservatorio de Malaga (Spain). He also studied jazz arranging and composition in Madrid and moved to Boston to enter the prestigious Berklee College of Music where he graduated magna cum laude with a dual B.A. in Film Scoring and Contemporary Writing & Production. And was granted the Arif Mardin Award for excellence in Music Production & Arranging.

Work

Film and Television

Discography

Awards and nominations

GoldSpirit Awards

Academy of Sciences and Arts of Television of Spain - Iris Awards

International Film Music Critics Association

Spanish Film Music Critics Awards

Cinema Writers Circle Awards, Spain

Garden State Film Festival

Premio Internacional de Composición Coral “Villa de Rota”

References
 iTunes Charts: El Tiempo Entre Costuras by Cesar Benito
  An Interview with Cesar Benito by John Mansell
  Review of El Tiempo Entre Costuras Original Soundtrack Album by John Broxton

External links 
 
 

Living people
Spanish film score composers
Male film score composers
Berklee College of Music alumni
Year of birth missing (living people)
Spanish male musicians